Newport Township is one of the twenty-two townships of Washington County, Ohio, United States.  The 2000 census found 2,176 people in the township.

Geography
Located in the southeastern part of the county along the Ohio River, it borders the following townships:
Lawrence Township - north
Independence Township - northeast
Marietta Township - west
Fearing Township - northwest corner

Pleasants County, West Virginia lies across the Ohio River to the southeast.

No municipalities are located in Newport Township, although the unincorporated community of Newport lies on the township's eastern shoreline.

Name and history
It is the only Newport Township statewide.

In 1833, Newport Township contained a meeting house, several brick school houses, two dry goods stores, and a flour mill.

The Hildreth Covered Bridge in Newport Township is listed on the National Register of Historic Places.

Government
The township is governed by a three-member board of trustees, who are elected in November of odd-numbered years to a four-year term beginning on the following January 1. Two are elected in the year after the presidential election and one is elected in the year before it. There is also an elected township fiscal officer, who serves a four-year term beginning on April 1 of the year after the election, which is held in November of the year before the presidential election. Vacancies in the fiscal officership or on the board of trustees are filled by the remaining trustees.

References

External links
County website
Newport, OH History Website

Townships in Washington County, Ohio
Townships in Ohio